Donald Alfred Stauffer (July 4, 1902 – August 8, 1952) was an American literary critic, novelist and Professor of English who spent the majority of his career at Princeton University.

Biography

Stauffer studied at Princeton University, where he completed his A.B. degree in 1923 and A.M. degree in 1924. He received both a Guggenheim Fellowship and Rhodes Scholarship to Merton College, Oxford, where he completed his D.Phil. degree in 1928. After completing his doctorate he returned to Princeton, where he spent most of his career as Professor of English and English Department Chairman.

He held the Eastman Professorship at the University of Oxford from 1951 to 1952. He unexpectedly died in Oxford in August 1952, aged 50.

His books included English Biography Before 1700 (Harvard, 1930). and 'The Nature of Poetry (Norton, 1946).

BibliographyEnglish Biography Before 1700 (1930)The Art of Biography in 18th Century England (1941)The Intent of the Critic (1941)Brother, This Is War (1945)The Nature of Poetry (1946)The Saint and the Hunchback'' (1946)

References 

1902 births
Princeton University faculty
American Rhodes Scholars
Princeton University alumni
Alumni of Merton College, Oxford
1952 deaths